A digital asset is anything that exists only in digital form and comes with a distinct usage right. Data that do not possess that right are not considered assets.

Digital assets include but are not exclusive to: digital documents, audible content, motion picture, and other relevant digital data that are currently in circulation or are, or will be stored on digital appliances such as: personal computers, laptops, portable media players, tablets, data storage devices, telecommunication devices, and any and all apparatuses which are, or will be in existence once technology progresses to accommodate for the conception of new modalities which would be able to carry digital assets; notwithstanding the proprietorship of the physical device onto which the digital asset is located.

Types
Types of digital assets include, but are not exclusive to: software, photography, logos, illustrations, animations, audiovisual media, presentations, spreadsheets, digital paintings, word documents, electronic mails, websites, and a multitude of other digital formats and their respective metadata. The number of different types of digital assets is exponentially increasing due to the rising number of devices, such as smartphones, which are conduits for digital media.

In Intel's presentation at the company's "Intel Developer Forum 2013" they named several new types of digital assets including: medical, education, voting, friendships, conversations and reputation amongst others.

Digital asset management system
A digital asset management (DAM) system represents an intertwined structure incorporating both software and hardware and/or other services in order to manage, store, ingest, organise and retrieve digital assets. Digital asset management systems allow users to find and use content when they need it.

Digital asset metadata
Metadata is data about other data. Any structured information that defines a specification of any form of data is referred to as metadata. Metadata is also a claimed relationship between two entities.

Librarian Lorcan Dempsey says to "Think of metadata as data which removes from a user (human or machine) the need to have full advance knowledge of the existence or characteristics of things of potential interest in the environment".

At first the term metadata was used for digital data exclusively, but nowadays metadata can apply to physical data as well as digital.

Catalogues, inventories, registers and other similar standardised forms of organising, managing and retrieving resources contain metadata.

Metadata can be stored and contained directly within the file it refers to or independently from it with the help of other forms of data management such as a DAM system.

The more metadata is assigned to an asset the easier it gets to categorise it, especially as the amount of information grows. The asset's value rises the more metadata it has for it becomes more accessible, easier to manage, and more complex.

Structured metadata can be shared with open protocols like OAI-PMH to allow further aggregation and processing. Open data sources like institutional repositories have thus been aggregated to form large datasets and academic search engines comprising tens of millions of open access works, like BASE, CORE and Unpaywall.

Issues
Due to a lack of either legislation or legal precedent, there is a limited control over digital assets.

Many of the control issues relating to access and transfer-ability are maintained by individual companies. Some consequences of this include 'What is to become of the assets once their owner is deceased?' as well as can, and, if so, how, may they be inherited.

This subject was broached in a bogus story about Bruce Willis allegedly looking to sue Apple as the end user agreement prevented him from bequeathing his iTunes collection to his children.

Another case of this was when a soldier died in duty and the family requested access to the Yahoo! account. When Yahoo! refused to grant access, the probate judge ordered them to give the emails to the family but Yahoo! still was not required to give access.

The Music Modernization bill was passed in September 2018 by US Congress to create a new music-licensing system, with the aim to help songwriters get paid more.

See also
Digital rights management
Digital asset management
Digital preservation
Digital goods
Digital inheritance

References

Library science
Digital media